Siliștea Crucii is a commune in Dolj County, Oltenia, Romania with a population of 1,811 people. It is composed of a single village, Siliștea Crucii.

References

Communes in Dolj County
Localities in Oltenia